Roberto Mazzoni (born 9 January 1937) is an Italian former sports shooter. He competed in the 25 metre pistol event at the 1960 Summer Olympics.

References

1937 births
Living people
Italian male sport shooters
Olympic shooters of Italy
Shooters at the 1960 Summer Olympics
Sportspeople from Florence